Fluorine azide or triazadienyl fluoride is a yellow green gas composed of nitrogen and fluorine with formula . The bond between the fluorine atom and the nitrogen is very weak, leading to this substance being very unstable and prone to explosion. Calculations show the F–N–N angle to be around 102° with a straight line of 3 nitrogen atoms.

The gas boils at –30° and melts at –139 °C.

It was first made by John F. Haller in 1942.

Reactions
Fluorine azide can be made by reacting hydrazoic acid and fluorine gas.

Another way to form it is by reacting sodium azide with fluorine.

Fluorine azide decomposes without explosion at normal temperatures to make dinitrogen difluoride:

.

At higher temperatures such as 1000 °C fluorine azide breaks up into nitrogen monofluoride radical:

The FN itself dimerizes on cooling.

Solid or liquid  explodes, releasing much heat. A thin film burns at the rate of 1.6 km/s. Because the explosion hazard is great only very small quantities of this substance should be handled at a time. A 0.02 g limit is recommended for experiments.

 adducts can be formed with the Lewis acids boron trifluoride and arsenic pentafluoride at -196 °C. These molecules bond with the Nα atom.

Properties

Spectroscopy

Shape
Distances between atoms are F–N 0.1444 nm, FN=NN 0.1253 nm and FNN=N 0.1132 nm.

Physical
 has a density of 1.3 g/cm3.

 adsorbs on to solid surfaces of potassium fluoride, but not onto lithium fluoride or sodium fluoride. This property was being investigated so that  could boost the energy of solid propellants.

The ultraviolet photoelectric spectrum shows ionisation peaks at 11.01, 13,72, 15.6, 15.9, 16.67, 18.2, and 19.7 eV. Respectively these are assigned to the orbitals: π, nN or nF, nF, πF, nN or σ, π and σ.

References

External links

Fluorine compounds
Azido compounds
Gases with color
Explosive gases
Explosive chemicals
Pseudohalogens